Lapine may refer to:

People
 Anatole Lapine (1930–2012), Latvian-born automotive designer and racing driver
 André Lapine (1866–1952), Latvian-born Canadian painter
 James Lapine (born 1949), American stage director, playwright, screenwriter and librettist
 Warren Lapine (born 1964), publisher of science fiction magazines

Other uses
 Lapine, Alabama, United States, an unincorporated community
 Lapine language, a fictional language spoken by the rabbits of Richard Adams' novel Watership Down

See also
 
 La Pine, Oregon, a city
 La Pine Senior High School